Cello Energy was an Alabama biofuels company beset by fraud allegations. The company proposed to produce energy from cellulosic ethanol. In 2010, the United States Environmental Protection Agency projected the company could produce 70 million gallons of cellulosic diesel before reducing their projections to 5million gallons and then removing the company from supplier listings in 2011.Cello Energy filed for bankruptcy in 2010.

See also
Abengoa Bioenergy
E3 BioFuels
Range Fuels
DuPont Danisco
Fiberight 
KL Energy 
KiOR
BioEnergy

References

Biofuel producers
Defunct companies based in Alabama
Defunct energy companies of the United States
Energy companies disestablished in 2010